I Finally Found Someone is a duet studio album by American country music artists Lorrie Morgan and Sammy Kershaw. It was released in 2001 by RCA Records Nashville and it is largely composed of duets between the two artists. Six of the songs are duets, while the other six are solo efforts (three from each artist). The only chart single from this album was "He Drinks Tequila", one of the duets, which peaked at No. 39 on the Billboard country chart. The title track is a cover of the Barbra Streisand/Bryan Adams duet. "What a Wonderful World", a cover of a song made famous by Louis Armstrong, is also included here.

Track listing

Personnel
Mike Brignardello - bass guitar
Shannon Brown - background vocals
Carol Chase - background vocals
J. T. Corenflos - electric guitar
Angel Cruz - background vocals
Diana DeWitt - background vocals
Larry Franklin - fiddle, mandolin
Sonny Garrish - steel guitar
Kevin "Swine" Grantt - bass guitar
Rob Hajacos - fiddle
Steve Hermann - trumpet
Bernie Herms - synthesizer, synthesizer strings
Kirk "Jelly Roll" Johnson - harmonica
Sammy Kershaw - lead vocals, background vocals
Jeff King - electric guitar
Paul Leim - drums, tambourine
B. James Lowry - acoustic guitar
Jerry McPherson - electric guitar
Lorrie Morgan - lead vocals, background vocals
Dale Oliver - electric guitar
Gary Prim - keyboards, piano, synthesizer
Brent Rowan - electric guitar
John Wesley Ryles - background vocals
Russell Terrell - background vocals
Bobby Terry - acoustic guitar, electric guitar
Biff Watson - acoustic guitar, gut string guitar
Bergen White - synthesizer string arrangements
Glenn Worf - bass guitar
Reggie Young - electric guitar

Chart performance

References

2001 albums
Lorrie Morgan albums
Sammy Kershaw albums
RCA Records albums
Vocal duet albums
Albums produced by Norro Wilson